This is a list of seasons played by Portsmouth FC Ladies in English football since 2003, when the Hampshire-based side entered the Women's Premier League. In all but one of the seasons since, Portsmouth FC Ladies have played in the Women's Premier League Southern Division, except for one season in the Women's Premier League National Division in the 2012/13 season.

Key

P = Played
W = Games won
D = Games drawn
L = Games lost
F = Goals for
A = Goals against
Pts = Points
Pos = Final position
WPL National = Women's Premier League National Division
WPL South = Women's Premier League Southern Division
PRL = Preliminary Round
GS = Group Stage
R1 = Round 1
R2 = Round 2
R3 = Round 3
R4 = Round 4
R5 = Round 5
QF = Quarter-Finals
SF = Semi-Finals
R/U = Runners-up
W = Winners

Note: bold text indicates a competition won.

Seasons
Football-related lists